"Dónde Irán" (Where will they go) is La 5ª Estación's first single release from their first studio album, Primera toma.

The song was used as the theme to the Mexican telenovela, Clase 406, the soap opera before Rebelde.

References 

La 5ª Estación songs
2002 singles
2002 songs
RCA Records singles
Songs written by Natalia Jiménez
Songs written by Pablo Domínguez
Songs written by Angel Reyero